Dhammananda Bhikkhuni, born Chatsumarn Kabilsingh or Chatsumarn Kabilsingh Shatsena (6 October 1944), is a Thai bhikkhuni ("Buddhist nun").  On 28 February 2003, Kabilsingh received full monastic ordination as a bhikkhuni of the Theravada tradition in Sri Lanka. She is Abbess of Songdhammakalyani Monastery, the only temple in Thailand where there are bhikkhunis.

Early life, education, and ordination 

Chatsumarn Kabilsingh was born in 1944 to Voramai Kabilsingh and Kokiat Shatsena. Her mother, Voramai, also called Ta Tao Fa Tzu (d. 2003), was ordained as bhikkhuni in a Dharmaguptaka lineage in Taiwan in 1971 – the first modern Thai bhikkhuni. Songdhammakalyani means "temple where women uphold the Dharma" and it is located in Nakhon Pathom near Bangkok.

Chatsumarn received Buddhist instruction and training along with the nuns. She says that her father, Kokiat, was "the first Thai man I knew who strongly supported the revival of the Bhikkhuni Sangha in Thailand." Unusual for Thai women, Chatsumarn received a higher education. After high school, she received her B.A. in Philosophy from Visva Bharati University, her M.A. in Religion from McMaster University in Canada, and her Ph.D. in Buddhism from Magadh University in India. She married, has three sons and six grandchildren. She taught for 27 years at Thammasat University in Bangkok, Thailand, in the Department of Philosophy and Religion. She is a well-known author of many books on contemporary issues in Asian Buddhism; many were published before her ordination and are under her birth name, Dr. Chatsumarn Kabilsingh.

She has often said that she knew she would become a monastic in the Buddhist tradition at some point in her life; she was just waiting for the right time. That time came in 2000 when she took early retirement from Thammasat University and received the bodhisattva's precept from the Fo Guang Shan order in Taiwan. In 2001, she took her sāmaṇerī ordination in Sri Lanka from R. Saddha Sumana Bhikkhuni and T. Dhammaloka Bhikkhu. In 2003, she was ordained a full bhikkhuni in Sri Lanka, the first Thai woman to be ordained in a Theravada monastic lineage, as Dhammananda. Her ordination lineage is Syamopali from Dambulla chapter. She currently resides at the Songdhammakalyani Monastery in the Muang District, Nakhonpathom province, Thailand. Since her ordination, Dhammananda has written more than 100 books, designed to educate the public about various issues related to Thai Buddhism, including the place of women.

Other activities 
Prior to her ordination, Dr. Kabilsingh wrote several books, including Thai Women in Buddhism (1991) which discusses the place of Thai Buddhist women in the context of Thai society, including those who choose to become maechi. Both as a layperson and a monastic, she has worked tirelessly to reestablish the Theravāda bhikkhuni lineage in Thailand so that women may become fully ordained monastics. She has encountered resistance from both laymen and monks in Thailand who believe female monastics are illegal and a corruption. Her work has caused some controversy in Thailand, although she receives much support from a growing number of Western Buddhist women.

In 1984, Kabilsingh started publishing Yasodhara: The Newsletter on International Buddhist Women's Activities, available in almost forty countries. Some articles from the Newsletter are available online. A few years later in 1991, Kabilsingh organized the first international conference of Buddhist women held in Bangkok, Thailand.

Dhammananda Bhikkhuni may be considered a Buddhist modernist writer, along with social activists and reformers such as Sulak Sivaraksa, A. T. Ariyaratne, Thích Nhất Hạnh, the 14th Dalai Lama, and Buddhadasa. There are several reasons for this designation. Most obvious is her work on the place of women in modern Asian Buddhism, especially the Theravāda tradition in Thailand. She writes/speaks about issues generally thought to constitute "socially engaged Buddhism" such as Buddhism and nature/ecology/environmental issues, Buddhism and poverty, Feminism and Buddhism, prostitution (in Thailand), and Buddhism and education (lay and monastic).

While Dhammananda has a somewhat global approach as evidenced by founding an international newsletter or hosting an international conference, she has repeatedly stated that most problems in Thailand must be solved by the Thai people without the "help" of outsiders, including Western Buddhists. The solutions she offers are generally down-to-earth, concrete, and practical with an occasional hint of idealism shared by other Buddhist modernists. She makes clear acknowledgments about both the weaknesses and strengths of the current Thai Sangha; her writing advocates serious reform for monastic and lay Buddhists, not the least of which is the reestablishment of the Bhikkhuni order. Nantawan Boonprasat-Lewis comments "Kabilsingh thus advocates for the Sangha to be more involved in providing spiritual guidance to the laity and deal with their own fear of having women be equal to men. The social crisis, she says, is greater than this fear and needs the cooperation and involvement of all, regardless of gender, class, and ethnicity."

In 2014, Dhammananda Bhikkhuni was appointed as Pavattini by a Sri Lankan preceptor during a group ordination for women monks in Songkhla, Thailand.

Recognition
She was recognized as one of the BBC's 100 women of 2019.

Comments by others

Quotes of Dhammananda Bhikkhuni

Works in English 
 A Comparative Study of Bhikkhunã Pàtimokkha. Chaukhambha Orientalia: India, 1981.
 A Cry From the Forest. 1981. (further information unavailable)
 Bhikkhunã Pàtimokkha of the Six Existing Schools. tr. Bangkok, 1991. Sri Satguru Publications, 1998.
 
 Buddhism and Nature Conservation. Bangkok, Thailand: Thammasat University Press, 1998.
 
 "Early Buddhists on Nature" in This Sacred Earth by Roger S. Gottlieb. Routledge, 2004. 130-133.
 "Reading Buddhist Texts with New Light" in Buddhist Exploration of Peace and Justice by Chanju Mun and Ronald S. Green. Honolulu, HI: Blue Pine Books, 2006. 89-96.
 Thai Women in Buddhism. Berkeley, CA: Parallax Press, 1991.
 Women and Buddhism. Institute of Women's Studies (St. Scholastica's College), Isis International (Manila, Philippines). Manila: Isis International, 1996.
 Women in Buddhism: Questions and Answers. First published 1998.

Other materials of interest 
 Boonprasat-Lewis, Nantawan and Marie M. Fortune. Remembering conquest: feminist/womanist perspectives on religion, colonization, and sexual violence. New York, London: Haworth Press, 1999. accessed on 4/20/2009.
 Interview with Dhammananda (among others) for ABC radio; Interviewed by Kerry Stewart: "The Kindness of Tigers – Buddhist Women" 
 Kristin Barendsen. "Ordained at Last" 
 Yasodhara, Newsletter on International Buddhist Women's Activities, Nakhonpathom, Thailand. Published since 1984

References 

Buddhist feminists
Buddhist monasticism
1944 births
Living people
Magadh University alumni
McMaster University alumni
Thai feminists
Visva-Bharati University alumni
Thai bhikkhuni
20th-century Buddhist nuns
21st-century Buddhist nuns
BBC 100 Women
21st-century Thai women